Spectral Worship is a studio album by the indie rock band Guv'ner, released in 1998 on Merge Records. The album contains a cover of "Jealous Guy", by John Lennon, re-titled "Jealous Girl".

Critical reception
The Washington Post thought that "singer-guitarist Charles Gansa, bassist-singer Pumpkin Wentzel and drummer Danny Tunick don't demolish traditional song form, but they do like to beat it up a bit." Philadelphia City Paper called the album "a charming swirl of their cheeky, off-key melodicisms and experimental tweeks and wonks ... Even bassist Pumpkin Wentzel's conceptually ill-conceived cover of John Lennon's 'Jealous Guy' works with a little chutzpah." NME concluded that the album "chews on exactly the same pop bubblegum as their previous releases with a nerdy hook here, a quirky instrument there (castanets, Moog, Spanish guitars, etc) but, unlike 1996’s The Hunt, it chooses to hide its considerable light under a bushel of obscurity."

AllMusic wrote that "the album is a frequently brilliant combination of acoustic guitars, assorted tone waves and other varied sounds, drawing them together into minimal but highly dynamic and well-constructed pieces in a beautifully rustic, desolate ballad style."

Track listing
 "Spectral Worship"
 "Chereza"
 "Love the Lamp"
 "Wounded Birds and Vampires own the Edge"
 "Anaphelact"
 "Coozwax"
 "Jealous Girl" (Lennon)
 "Time Rarely Stand Still"  [sic]
 "Anything"
 "Difficulty in Openness"
 "Someone Else"
 "Spectral Workshop"
 "Welcome"

Instrumentation and Personnel
Charles Gansa (guitar, vocals)
Pumpkin Wentzel (bass, vocals)
Danny Tunick (drums, marimba)
Cindy Greene (whistling)
Nicky Furnace (backing vocals, handclaps)
So Yong Kim (tongue claps)
Michael Rohatyn (vocals)

References

External links
Spectral Worship on MergeRecords.com

1998 albums
Merge Records albums